Ugia trigonalis is a species of moth in the family Erebidae. It is found in Indonesia (Sumatra).

References

Moths described in 1982
Ugia
Moths of Indonesia